Alexandru Vlahuță (formerly Pleșești) is a commune in Vaslui County, Western Moldavia, Romania. The commune is named for native son, writer Alexandru Vlahuță (1858-1919). It is composed of four villages: Alexandru Vlahuță, Buda, Ghicani and Morăreni. It also administers Dealu Secării and Florești villages, legally part of Poienești Commune. Moreover, it included Ibănești, Mânzați and Puțu Olarului villages until 2003, when these were split off to form Ibănești Commune.

References

Communes in Vaslui County
Localities in Western Moldavia